Poplar and Canning Town was a borough constituency represented in the House of Commons of the Parliament of the United Kingdom. It elected one Member of Parliament (MP) by the first past the post system of election.

History
The constituency was created in the 1997 general election from the constituencies of Bow and Poplar and Newham South, and was divided at the 2010 general election between the realigned seat of Poplar and Limehouse and the neighbouring West Ham seat. It was held by the Labour Party for the entire period of its existence.

Boundaries

As the constituency's name suggested, it covered Poplar and Canning Town, as well as Limehouse and the Isle of Dogs. The breakdown of wards was:
London Borough of Newham: Beckton, Canning Town and Grange, Custom House and Silvertown, Ordnance.
London Borough of Tower Hamlets: Blackwall, Bromley, East India, Lansbury, Limehouse, Millwall, Shadwell.

Boundary review
Following their review of parliamentary representation in North London, the Boundary Commission for England recommended the creation of an altered Poplar and Limehouse seat, to be fought at the 2010 general election.

Members of Parliament

Elections

Elections in the 1990s

Elections in the 2000s

References

Politics of the London Borough of Newham
Politics of the London Borough of Tower Hamlets
Constituencies of the Parliament of the United Kingdom established in 1997
Constituencies of the Parliament of the United Kingdom disestablished in 2010
Parliamentary constituencies in London (historic)
Poplar, London
Canning Town